Pravonín is a municipality and village in Benešov District in the Central Bohemian Region of the Czech Republic. It has about 600 inhabitants.

Administrative parts
Villages of Buková, Karhule, Křížov, Lesáky, Tisek and Volavka are administrative parts of Pravonín.

References

Villages in Benešov District